William Bell (5 September 1931 – 23 July 2002) was a cricketer who played first-class cricket for Canterbury, Auckland and New Zealand from 1949 to 1959.

Bell attended Christchurch Boys' High School. A leg spin and googly bowler and lower-order batsman, Bell had played only five first-class games when he was picked for the New Zealand tour of South Africa in 1953-54 when regular spinner Alex Moir was left out of the touring party. An early return of four wickets against Eastern Province suggested he might do well, but in two Test match appearances, at Cape Town and Port Elizabeth, he took just two wickets, and was never picked again.

References

External links
 

1931 births
2002 deaths
People educated at Christchurch Boys' High School
New Zealand cricketers
New Zealand Test cricketers
Auckland cricketers
Canterbury cricketers
Cricketers from Dunedin